Rio Ouchi (born 22 September 1998) is a Japanese professional footballer who plays as a forward for WE League club Sanfrecce Hiroshima Regina.

Club career 
Ouchi made her WE League debut on 14 November 2021.

References 

Living people
1998 births
Japanese women's footballers
Women's association football forwards
Association football people from Shizuoka Prefecture
Sanfrecce Hiroshima Regina players
WE League players